Ellen Naomi Cohen (September 19, 1941 – July 29, 1974), known professionally as Mama Cass and later on as Cass Elliot, was an American singer and voice actress. She was a member of the singing group The Mamas & the Papas. After the group broke up, Elliot released five solo albums. In 1998, she was posthumously inducted into the Rock and Roll Hall of Fame for her work with the Mamas & the Papas.

Early life
Ellen Naomi Cohen was born in Baltimore, Maryland, on September 19, 1941, the daughter of Philip (died 1962) and Bess Cohen (née Levine; 1915–1994). All four of her grandparents were Russian Jewish immigrants. Her family was subject to significant financial stresses and uncertainties during her childhood years. Her father, involved in several business ventures, ultimately succeeded through the development of a lunch wagon in Baltimore that provided meals to construction workers. Her mother was a trained nurse. Elliot had a brother, Joseph, and a younger sister, Leah, who also became a singer and recording artist. Elliot's early life was spent with her family in Alexandria, Virginia, before the family moved to Baltimore when Elliot was 15, and where they had briefly lived at the time of Elliot's birth.

Elliot adopted the name "Cass" in high school, possibly borrowing it from actress Peggy Cass, according to Denny Doherty. She assumed the surname "Elliot" some time later, in memory of a friend who had died. While in Alexandria, she attended George Washington High School. When Elliot's family returned to Baltimore, she attended Forest Park High School. While attending Forest Park High School, Elliot became interested in acting. She won a small part in the play The Boy Friend, a summer stock production at the Hilltop Theatre in Owings Mills, Maryland. She left high school shortly before graduation and moved to New York City to further her acting career (as recounted in the lyrics to "Creeque Alley").

Early career
After leaving high school to pursue an entertainment career in New York, Elliot toured in the musical The Music Man in 1962, but lost the part of Miss Marmelstein in I Can Get It for You Wholesale to Barbra Streisand. Elliot would sometimes sing while working as a cloakroom attendant at The Showplace in Greenwich Village, but she did not pursue a singing career until she moved to the Washington, DC, area to attend American University (not Swarthmore College, as mentioned in the biographical song "Creeque Alley").

America's folk music scene was on the rise when Elliot met banjoist and singer Tim Rose and singer John Brown, and the three began performing as The Triumvirate. In 1963, James Hendricks replaced Brown, and the trio was renamed the Big 3. Elliot's first recording with the Big 3 was "Winken, Blinken, and Nod", released by FM Records in 1963. In 1964, the group appeared on an "open mic" night at The Bitter End in Greenwich Village, billed as Cass Elliot and the Big 3, followed onstage by folk singer Jim Fosso and bluegrass banjoist Eric Weissberg.

Tim Rose left the Big 3 in 1964, and Elliot and Hendricks teamed with Canadians Zal Yanovsky and Denny Doherty to form the Mugwumps. This group lasted eight months, after which Cass performed as a solo act for a while. In the meantime, Yanovsky and John Sebastian co-founded the Lovin' Spoonful, while Doherty joined the New Journeymen, a group that also included John Phillips and his wife Michelle. In 1965, Doherty persuaded Phillips that Elliot should join the group, which she did while the group members and she were vacationing in the Virgin Islands.

A popular legend about Elliot is that her vocal range was improved by three notes after she was hit on the head by some copper tubing while walking through a construction site behind the bar where the New Journeymen were playing in the Virgin Islands. Elliot confirmed the story in a 1968 interview with Rolling Stone, saying:

Friends later said, though,  that the pipe story was a less embarrassing explanation for why John Phillips had kept her out of the group for so long, because he considered her too fat.

The Mamas and the Papas
With two female members, the New Journeymen needed a new name. According to Doherty, Elliot had the inspiration for the band's new name; as written on his website:

Doherty also said that the occasion marked the beginning of his affair with Michelle Phillips. Elliot was in love with Doherty and was displeased when he told her of the affair. Doherty has said that Elliot once proposed to him, but that he was so stoned at the time that he could not even respond.

Elliot was known for her sense of humor and optimism, and was considered by many to be the most charismatic member of the group. Her powerful, distinctive voice was a major factor in their string of hits including: "California Dreamin'", "Monday, Monday", and "Words of Love". She also performed the solo "Dream a Little Dream of Me" (credited on the label of the single as 'Featuring Mama Cass with the Mamas and the Papas'), which the group recorded in 1968 after learning about the death of Fabian Andre, one of the men who co-wrote it, whom Michelle Phillips had met years earlier. Elliot's version is noteworthy for its contemplative pace, whereas many earlier recordings of "Dream a Little Dream of Me" (including one by Nat King Cole and another by Ozzie Nelson) had been up-tempo versions—the song having been written in 1931 as a dance tune.

The Mamas and the Papas continued to record to meet the terms of their record contract until 1971.

Solo career
After the breakup of the Mamas and the Papas, Elliot embarked on a solo singing career. Her most successful recording during this period was 1968's "Dream a Little Dream of Me" from her solo album of the same name, released by Dunhill Records, though it had originally been released earlier that year on the album The Papas & the Mamas Presented by the Mamas and the Papas.

Las Vegas show

In October 1968, Elliot made her live solo debut headlining in Las Vegas at Caesars Palace, scheduled for a three-week engagement at $40,000 per week with two shows per night. According to Elliot, she went on a six-month crash diet before the show, losing 100 of her 300 pounds. However, she attributed a stomach ulcer and throat problems to her severe regimen, which she treated by drinking milk and cream—regaining 50 pounds in the process.

She was confined to her bed for three weeks before the first performance while the musical director, band, and production supervisor attempted to put together a show in her absence. She was scheduled to rehearse for a full three days before the show opened, but she managed to get through only part of one run-through with the band before saying that she was losing her voice. She skipped the remainder of rehearsals and drank tea and lemon, hoping to recover and pull herself together for opening night.

An audience of 950 people filled the Circus Maximus theater at Caesar's Palace on the evening of Wednesday October 16, including Sammy Davis Jr., Peter Lawford, Jimi Hendrix, Joan Baez, Liza Minnelli, and Mia Farrow, who had sent flowers to Elliot's dressing room, but backstage she had developed a raging fever. Friends urged her manager to cancel the show, but she felt that it was too important and insisted on performing. Sick and having barely rehearsed, she began to fall apart during the course of her first performance; her voice was weak and barely audible, and the large crowd was unsympathetic, despite the celebrity well-wishers. At the end of the show, Elliot returned to the stage to apologize to the audience; "This is the first night, and it will get better", she said. She then sang "Dream a Little Dream of Me" and left the stage as the audience applauded half-heartedly. She returned later that night to perform the second show, but her voice was worse, and many of the audience noisily walked out.

Reviews were harsh. Esquire magazine called the show "Sink Along with Cass" and "a disaster" that was "heroic in proportion, epic in scope". The Los Angeles Free Press called it "an embarrassing drag", while Newsweek compared it to the Titanic disaster: "Like some great ocean liner embarking on an ill-fated maiden voyage, Mama Cass slid down the waves and sank to the bottom". The show closed after only one night, and Elliot flew back to Los Angeles for what was described as "a tonsillectomy".

Later work

Elliot appeared in two television variety specials: The Mama Cass Television Program (ABC, 1969) and Don't Call Me Mama Anymore (CBS, 1973). She was a regular guest on TV talk shows and variety shows in the early 1970s, including The Mike Douglas Show, The Andy Williams Show, Hollywood Squares, The Johnny Cash Show, The Ray Stevens Show, The Smothers Brothers Comedy Hour, and The Carol Burnett Show, and was a guest panelist for a week on the game show Match Game '73. She guest-hosted for Johnny Carson on The Tonight Show and appeared as a guest on the show 13 other times. She also appeared on and co-hosted The Music Scene on ABC and was featured on the first The Midnight Special on NBC.

She performed the title song "The Good Times Are Comin'" during the opening sequence of the 1970 film Monte Walsh, starring Lee Marvin and Jack Palance. In 1972, she made three appearances on the variety series The Julie Andrews Hour. Her final appearance on the show was the Christmas installment that aired on Wednesday, December 20, 1972. In December 1978, four years after Elliot's death, the episode was rebroadcast on syndicated stations as a Christmas special called Merry Christmas With Love, Julie. However, all of Elliot's solos were deleted from the syndicated prints. In 2009, a complete videotape of The Julie Andrews Hour Christmas Show was donated to The Paley Center For Media in New York, with all of Elliot's numbers intact.

In 1973, Elliot performed in Saga of Sonora, a TV music-comedy-Western special with Jill St. John, Vince Edwards, Zero Mostel, and Lesley Ann Warren.

She also sang the jingle "Hurry on down to Hardee's, where the burgers are charco-broiled" for Hardee's advertisements.

Throughout the early 1970s, Elliot continued her acting career, as well. She had a featured role in the movie Pufnstuf (1970) and made guest appearances on TV's The New Scooby-Doo Movies, Young Dr. Kildare, Love, American Style, and The Red Skelton Show, among others.

In 1973, Elliot hired as her manager Allan Carr, who was also managing the careers of Tony Curtis, Ann-Margret, and Peter Sellers. Carr felt Elliot needed to leave pop and rock music altogether and head into the cabaret circuit, so a show was put together comprising old standards along with a few new songs written for her by friends. The act included Elliot and two male singers who served as backup singers and sidekicks during the musical numbers. The title of the show was Don't Call Me Mama Anymore, named after one of the songs written by Elliot's friend Earle Brown. The song was born out of Elliot's frustration with being identified as "Mama Cass".

The show debuted in Pittsburgh on February 9, 1973. Elliot felt ready to tackle Las Vegas once again and premiered at the Flamingo. This time, she received rave reviews. The Las Vegas Sun wrote, "Cass Elliot, making a strong point that she is no longer Mama Cass, has a good act serving notice that she is here to stay. The audience was with her all the way ... no empty seats anywhere." She then took her act to higher-echelon casinos and swankier nightclubs in cities throughout the country.

Personal life
Elliot was married twice, the first time in 1963 to James Hendricks, her group mate in the Big 3 and the Mugwumps. It was a marriage of convenience to assist him in avoiding being drafted during the Vietnam War; the marriage was never consummated and was annulled in 1968. In 1971, Elliot married journalist Donald von Wiedenman, heir to a Bavarian barony. Their marriage ended in divorce after a few months.

Elliot gave birth to a daughter, Owen Vanessa Elliot, on April 26, 1967. Owen also grew up to become a singer and toured with Beach Boys member Al Jardine. Elliot never publicly identified the father, but many years later, Michelle Phillips helped Owen locate her biological father, Chuck Day. His paternity was not publicly revealed until his 2008 death. After Elliot's death, her younger sister, Leah Kunkel (then married to Los Angeles-based session drummer Russ Kunkel), gained custody of seven-year-old Owen and raised her along with her own son, Nathaniel.

Drug use 
Within hours of the end of Elliot's Las Vegas concert, rumors began to spread that she had been taking drugs during the weeks leading up to it. Eddi Fiegel wrote in the biography Dream a Little Dream of Me that Elliot later admitted to a boyfriend that she had injected heroin immediately before going on stage. Embarrassed by the debacle, Elliot plunged into a deep depression. David Crosby published a memoir in 1988 saying Elliot and he used opiates, cocaine, and heroin together, preferring to use heroin in London because of its availability there.

London hotel theft and court case
In 1967, while staying in London, Elliot was prosecuted for stealing bed linen from an apartment where she had been staying on an earlier visit. She denied responsibility, and the case was brought before the West London magistrates' court, where the charges against her were dismissed in the absence of any evidence. The Mamas and the Papas were forced to cancel the upcoming British concerts as a result of the incident, and the band broke up the next year. On a return visit to London, Elliot admitted to the audience at the London Palladium that she had taken two sheets, saying "I liked 'em so I took 'em". She said she had kept quiet because of the way she had been treated in police custody.

Death

On April 22, 1974, Elliot collapsed in the California television studio of The Tonight Show Starring Johnny Carson immediately before her scheduled appearance on the show. She was treated at a hospital and released, then dismissed the incident as simple exhaustion in interviews such as her May 7 appearance on The Tonight Show and the Philadelphia-based television talk show The Mike Douglas Show. 

Her appearance on that episode of The Mike Douglas Show, syndicated to local stations throughout the United States in July, turned out to be her last for American television.  Elliot’s mother can be seen in the studio audience. Commenting on the growing trend of cohabitation without marriage, Elliot says, “It would not break my heart if my daughter did not get married.” Douglas insisted that Elliot’s mother comment on that issue, and she said, “Well, I think it’s dynamite. I’m just jealous that I’m not living it now.” Another Douglas Show guest, Jack Anderson, discussed the Watergate tapes, and Elliot commented on whether the American people should hear them in their entirety, including “expletives deleted.”

A very short time after the July 15, 1974, videotaping of The Mike Douglas Show in Philadelphia, Cass Elliot flew to London. She performed a fortnight of concerts as a solo performer at the London Palladium. After her last scheduled appearance, which was Saturday night, July 27, Elliot went on a 24-hour celebration. She first attended the 31st  birthday party of Mick Jagger at his home at Tite Street in Chelsea. Debbie Reynolds claimed in her 2013 book Unsinkable: A Memoir that she and her children, Carrie Fisher and Todd Fisher, saw Elliot at the birthday party. Reynolds noted that though many guests left the party in pairs or groups, Elliot was alone when she left early in the morning. After the party, Elliot went to a "breakfast-lunch" in her honor presented by Georgia Brown. While there, according to biographer Eddi Fiegel, Elliot was blowing her nose frequently, coughing and having trouble breathing. Next she attended a cocktail party hosted by American entertainment journalist Jack Martin. She seemed in very high spirits but also appeared physically exhausted and sick. Elliot left that party at 8:00 pm on Sunday, July 28, stating she was tired and needed to get some sleep.

Elliot retired to an apartment in Mayfair at Curzon Place at which singer-songwriter Harry Nilsson allowed her to stay. There, she made an international call to Michelle Phillips. Phillips said many years later that Elliot sounded elated that she had received standing ovations each night. Phillips recalls, "She had had a little champagne, and was crying. She felt she had finally made the transition from Mama Cass."

Elliot’s road manager George Caldwell was also staying in Harry Nilsson’s flat, though in a separate bedroom. Elliot slept alone, as she had on previous nights.  That night, several hours after Elliot left Jack Martin’s cocktail party, she died in her sleep at age 32. According to forensic pathologist Keith Simpson, who conducted her autopsy, her death was due to heart failure. "There was left-sided heart failure," he wrote, "she had a heart attack which developed rapidly." A drug screen that was part of the forensic autopsy revealed there were no drugs in her system. Elliot died in Flat 12, 9 Curzon Place (later Curzon Square), Shepherd Market, Mayfair, London, owned by Harry Nilsson. Four years later, The Who's drummer Keith Moon died in the same bedroom, also aged 32 years.

Elliot's body was cremated at the Hollywood Forever Cemetery in Los Angeles, California. Her ashes were later buried in Mount Sinai Memorial Park Cemetery in Los Angeles.

An oft-repeated urban legend is that Elliot choked to death on a ham sandwich. The story spread soon after the discovery of her body and was based on speculation in the initial media coverage. A 2014 article in Haaretz stated "Unfortunately, the first doctor [in London] who examined her speculated to the press about the cause of death, and that's the version that stuck." An autopsy had not been performed when the physician was quoted and the Metropolitan Police told reporters that a partially eaten sandwich found in her room might have been relevant to the cause of death. When Keith Simpson performed the autopsy, he determined that Elliot had died of heart failure and that no food was present in her windpipe.  In 2020, Hollywood Reporter columnist Sue Cameron, a friend of Elliot's, offered a different explanation. She stated that she had identified a ham sandwich as Elliot's cause of death at the request of Elliot's manager, Allan Carr, who believed Elliot's death was drug-related and wanted to protect her reputation. However, no drugs were found in Elliot's system.

Tributes and other popular culture references

Civic events
The city of Baltimore dedicated August 15, 1973, as "Cass Elliot Day" in her honor for her homecoming.

Films and plays
The British play and film Beautiful Thing feature her recordings, and one character reflects on her memories of Elliot. Elliot was the subject of a 2004 stage production in Dublin, The Songs of Mama Cass, with Kristin Kapelli performing main vocals.

She is portrayed by Rachel Redleaf in the 2019 film Once Upon a Time in Hollywood.

She was also portrayed by Shannon Lee in the Bruce Lee Biopic Dragon: The Bruce Lee Story

Music
The song "Mama, I Remember You Now" by Swedish artist Marit Bergman is a tribute to Elliot.

The Frank Zappa song "We're Turning Again" references the urban legend of Cass choking to death. "We can visit Big Mama, we can whap her on the back, while she eats her sandwich!"

TISM song "(He'll Never Be An) Ol' Man River" cites her conjectured cause of death among a catalogue of other famous "bad ends" from the history of popular music: "Mama Cass' sandwich, I ate the same!".

The "Weird Al" Yankovic song "Close but No Cigar" also references the urban legend, with the narrator being "all choked up like Mama Cass".

The Foetus song "The Throne of Agony" makes further reference to the urban legend, with JG Thirwell claiming that he was "the one who gave the sandwich to Mama Cass".

The Crosby, Stills & Nash Daylight Again video released in 1982 was dedicated to Cass Elliot, as was the Crosby, Stills & Nash Greatest Hits album released in 2005.

Television
Elliot's recording of "Make Your Own Kind of Music" is featured prominently in several episodes of seasons two and three of Lost as well as season eight, episodes two and nine of Dexter (the later one also uses the title as the episode's title). It was also featured in ABC's The Middle when Sue Heck graduates from high school and in Netflix's Sex Education when Aimee smashes up an abandoned car. Her recording of "It's Getting Better" is featured in a season-four episode of Lost.

She provided the voice for her appearance on the 1973 episode of The New Scooby-Doo Movies, "The Haunted Candy Factory". She also appeared on Scooby-Doo! Mystery Incorporated in the episodes "The Secret Serum", "Pawn of Shadows", and "Dance of the Undead" as a Crystal Cove citizen.

Walk of Fame
Elliot received the 2,735th star on the Hollywood Walk of Fame on October 3, 2022.

Discography

Albums

The Big 3
 1963: The Big 3
 1964: Live at the Recording Studio

The Mugwumps
 1965: The Mugwumps

The Mamas and the Papas
 1966: If You Can Believe Your Eyes and Ears
 1966: The Mamas & the Papas
 1967: The Mamas and the Papas Deliver
 1968: The Papas & The Mamas
 1970: Monterey Pop Festival (Live) (recorded in 1967)
 1971: People Like Us

Solo

"-" indicates the album did not chart or was not released in that territory.

Soundtracks
 1970: Pufnstuf (soundtrack with Mama Cass)
 1971: "The Costume Ball" from Doctor's Wives 
 1996: Beautiful Thing (soundtrack with Mama Cass and the Mamas and the Papas)

Singles

See also

References

External links

 The Official Cass Elliot Website
 

1941 births
1974 deaths
20th-century American actresses
20th-century American women singers
Actresses from Baltimore
American women pop singers
American women rock singers
American film actresses
American folk rock musicians
American musical theatre actresses
American people of Russian-Jewish descent
American television actresses
American University alumni
Burials at Mount Sinai Memorial Park Cemetery
Dunhill Records artists
Jewish American musicians
Jewish folk singers
Musicians from Alexandria, Virginia
Musicians from Baltimore
Singers from Maryland
Sunshine pop
The Mamas and the Papas members
20th-century American singers
People from Laurel Canyon, Los Angeles